Hygrocybe anomala is a mushroom of the waxcap genus Hygrocybe. Known from Australia, it was first described scientifically by A.M. Young in 1997.

References

External links

Fungi of Australia
Anomala
Fungi described in 1997